Pakistani singers and bands became popular during the early nineties, with pop, rock and Ghazal becoming more fashionable with the younger generations. This article contains a list of notable singers who are based in Pakistan. This list includes singers  who  in many genres including pop, rock, jazz, traditional, classical, Ghazals styles or folk music.
Following are the most popular Pakistani pop singers of all times.

For more pop singers by their letter specifications you can find it below.

A 
 Aamir Saleem
 Abrar-ul-Haq
 Ahmed Jahanzeb
 Alamgir
 Ali Azmat
 Ali Haider
 Ali Khan
 Ali Zafar
 Amir Jamal
 Aamir Zaki
 Annie Khalid
 Arshad Mahmood
 Arshad Mehmood
 Atif Aslam
 Ahmad Rushdi
Amanat Ali
Asad Ahmed
Asim Azhar
Aima Baig

B 

 Bilal Saeed
 Benjamin Sisters
 Bilal Maqsood
 Bilal Khan

D 

 Damia Farooq

F 
 Faakhir mehmood 
 Fakhre Alam 
 Farhan Saeed
 Faraz Anwar
Faisal Kapadia
Fariha Pervez

G 

 Goher Mumtaz

H 
 Haroon Rashid
 Hasan Jahangir
Humaira Arshad
Hadiqa Kiani

K 

 Kashif Ali

I 
 Imran Khan
Imran Muhammad Akhoond

J 
 Jawad Ahmed
 Junaid Jamshaid
Jabbar Abbas
Jawad Bashir
Junaid Khan

M 
 Muhammad Ali Shahki
Mustafa Zahid
Momina Mustehsan

N 
 Najam Sheraz
 Nazia Hassan
 Nazia Iqbal
 Nadia Ali
 Nouman Javaid
Nusrat Hussain
Nabeel Shaukat Ali

Q 

 Quratulain Balouch

R 
 Rabi Peerzada
 Rahim Shah
 Rahat Fateh Ali Khan
Rizwan Butt

S 
 Shafqat Amanat Ali
 Sajjad Ali
 Saleem Javed
 Shafqat Ali Khan
 Shehzad Roy
 Shiraz Uppal
 Sanam Marvi
 Salman Ahmad
Sahir Ali Bagga
Shani Arshad
Sara Haider

U 

 Umair Jaswal
 Uzair Jaswal

W 
 Waqar Ali
 Waris Baig

Z 

 Zoheb Hassan
 Zoe Viccaji

See also 
 Music of South Asia
 Music of Pakistan
 Culture of Pakistan
 History of Pakistani pop music
 List of Pakistani musicians
 List of songs about Pakistan
 Sufi rock
 Filmi pop
 National Academy of Performing Arts

Pop singers
Lists of singers by nationality
List
Lists of pop musicians